Cornwall is the westernmost of the three historic counties into which Jamaica is divided. It has no current-day administrative significance. It includes Montego Bay, the island's second largest city by area.

The county of Cornwall is shown in green

History
Jamaica's three counties were established in 1758 to facilitate the holding of courts along the lines of the British County court system. Cornwall, the westernmost, was named after the westernmost county of England. Savanna-la-Mar was its county town.

Parishes

References

Counties of Jamaica
1758 establishments in the British Empire